Jenny Nicolle is a former international lawn bowler from Guernsey.

Bowls career
Nicolle won a silver medal in the Women's pairs at the 1986 Commonwealth Games in Edinburgh with Marie Smith. She also competed in the singles at the 1994 Commonwealth Games. She retired from bowls in 1996.

Personal life
She worked in the finance industry and is married to fellow international bowler Mike Smith and is a trustee for the Guernsey Charitable Trust.

References

Living people
Guernsey female bowls players
Commonwealth Games medallists in lawn bowls
Commonwealth Games silver medallists for Guernsey
Bowls players at the 1986 Commonwealth Games
Bowls players at the 1994 Commonwealth Games
Year of birth missing (living people)
Medallists at the 1986 Commonwealth Games